Donald Alan McKenzie (born 3 June 1960) is a British fencer. He competed in the individual and team foil events at the 1988 and 1992 Summer Olympics. In 1989, he won the foil title at the British Fencing Championships.

References

External links
 

1960 births
Living people
British male fencers
Olympic fencers of Great Britain
Fencers at the 1988 Summer Olympics
Fencers at the 1992 Summer Olympics
Sportspeople from Edinburgh